In medicine, tenderness is pain or discomfort when an affected area is touched. It should not be confused with the pain that a patient perceives without touching. Pain is patient's perception, while tenderness is a sign that a clinician elicits.

See also
Rebound tenderness, an indication of peritonitis.

References

Pain